HMS Barbara has been the name of more than one ship of the British Royal Navy, and may refer to:

 , a 14-gun schooner purchased in 1796 and known to be in service in 1801
 , a 10-gun schooner launched in 1806, in French hands as privateer Pératy 1807-1808 before returning to British service, and was sold in 1815.

Barbara